Edward Cunningham Foster (February 13, 1887 – January 15, 1937) was an American professional baseball third baseman. He played in Major League Baseball (MLB) from 1910 to 1923 for the New York Highlanders, Washington Senators, Boston Red Sox, and St. Louis Browns.

Career
Foster played in the minor leagues from 1906 to 1909, then appeared in 30 games for the New York Highlanders in 1910, hitting only .133. He returned to the minor leagues in 1911. Foster's longest stint with a professional team came with the Washington Senators between 1912 and 1919. He had one of his best seasons in 1912, finishing with career highs in hits (176), doubles (34), and runs batted in (70).

In the first month of the 1913 season, Foster contracted typhoid fever. He was treated at Georgetown University Hospital, where he was cared for by a nurse named Mary Chrismond. Foster and Chrismond got married in 1915.

Foster was known for his ability to hit the ball to a given part of the field, and Senators pitcher Walter Johnson appreciated Foster's ability to field bunts at third base.

AFter the 1919 season, the Senators traded Foster, Harry Harper, and Mike Menosky to the Boston Red Sox for Braggo Roth and Red Shannon. The Red Sox waived Foster in August 1922, and the St. Louis Browns claimed him. He hit .306 for the 1922 Browns, but he hit only .180 in 37 games in 1923 before retiring. In 1500 games over 13 seasons, Foster posted a .264 batting average (1490-for-5652) with 732 runs, 191 doubles, 71 triples, 6 home runs, 451 RBI, 195 stolen bases, 528 bases on balls, .329 on-base percentage and .326 slugging percentage. He finished his career with a .935 fielding percentage playing mostly at third base but also at second base and shortstop.

Later life and death

In early 1924, Foster said that he would study to become a minister rather than returning to baseball. He died in Washington, D.C. in 1937 after being involved in an automobile accident several days earlier. He is interred at Columbia Gardens Cemetery.

See also
 List of Major League Baseball career stolen bases leaders

References

External links

1887 births
1937 deaths
Major League Baseball third basemen
Washington Senators (1901–1960) players
New York Yankees players
Boston Red Sox players
St. Louis Browns players
Road incident deaths in Washington, D.C.
Coffeyville Bricks players
Harrisburg Senators players
Williamsport Millionaires players
Jersey City Skeeters players
Rochester Bronchos players
Baseball players from Chicago
Bradford Drillers players